Heath High School may refer to:
Heath High School (Kentucky) in West Paducah, Kentucky
Heath High School (Ohio) in Heath, Ohio
Rockwall-Heath High School in Heath, Texas